This was a new event in the 2017 ITF Women's Circuit.

Madison Brengle won the title, defeating Danielle Collins in the final, 4–6, 6–2, 6–3.

Seeds

Draw

Finals

Top half

Bottom half

References
Main Draw

LTP Charleston Pro Tennis - Singles
LTP Charleston Pro Tennis